Tartar is a city in and the capital of the Tartar District of Azerbaijan.

Its population is approximately 18,200, as of 2008. During the Russian Empire, the city was the administrative center of the Jevanshir Uyezd of the Elisabethpol Governorate. The town was subjected to bombardment by the Armenian forces in 2020 Nagorno-Karabakh war.

History 
From 1947 to 1949, Tartar had the status of an urban-type settlement, which was then transformed into the city of Mirbashir, named after the Azerbaijani Soviet party leader Mirbashir Gasimov. In 1963, the Tartar district was abolished and its territory was merged into Barda District, alongside the city of Tartar. It became independent again in 1965. On 7 February 1991, the historical name of the town, Tartar, was restored.

In 1994, during the First Nagorno-Karabakh War, Armenian armed forces launched a large-scale attack on the city. Azerbaijani forces managed to hold their positions in Tartar until the ceasefire was established, following which the city came only a few kilometers from the line of contact. After the ceasefire, it constantly came under fire from the Armenian forces.

On 27 September 2020, the Second Nagorno-Karabakh War began. From 30 September to the end of the war, the city of Tartar was subjected to a bombardment from the Armenian side. According to Aide to the President of Azerbaijan, Hikmat Hajiyev, over 2,000 shells were fired at the city on 2 October alone.

On 8 July 2022, the master plan for the development of the city until 2038 was approved.

Demographics 
According to the 1897 census, Tartar—mentioned as Terter—had a population of 752 consisting of 565 Muslims and 122 Armenian Apostolics. The village had 496 men and 256 women.

References

External links 
 
 World Gazetteer: Azerbaijan – World-Gazetteer.com
 Terter 

Populated places in Tartar District